The Affair of Colonel Redl is a Czech comedy film directed by Karel Anton. German version of the movie The Case of Colonel Redl was released in 1931.
The film is considered lost.

Cast
Emil Artur Longen as Alfred Redl
Marie Grossová as Countess Vera Nikolayevna
Jiří Sedláček as Štěpán Dolan
Truda Grosslichtová as Eva, Dolan's fiancée
Jan Sviták as Count Boris Maximovich Marchenko
 Josef Rovenský as Russian spy Daragiyev
 Čeněk Šlégl as Archduke
 Jiří Steimar as Head of Russian Secret service

See also
Colonel Redl (1925) Austrian film
Colonel Redl (1985) Hungarian film

References

External links
 

1931 drama films
1931 films
Czech black-and-white films
Czechoslovak black-and-white films
Czechoslovak multilingual films
Czech films based on plays
Czechoslovak drama films
1931 multilingual films
1930s Czech films